Eupithecia orichloris is a species of moth that is native to Kauai, Oahu, Maui, Lanai and Hawaii.

It is known for having its larval form as a caterpillar which is insectivorous. The caterpillar has two abdominal appendages which serve as triggers to initiate a backward motion by which it grasps prey insects using a spiny pair of forelegs.

References

orichloris
Endemic moths of Hawaii
Moths described in 1899